Los Angeles magazine is a monthly publication dedicated to covering Los Angeles. Founded in the spring of 1961 by David Brown, the magazine is currently owned and published by Hour Media Group, LLC. Los Angeles magazine's combination of feature writing, investigative reporting, service journalism, and design has earned the publication three National Magazine Awards. The magazine covers people, lifestyle, culture, entertainment, fashion, art and architecture, and news. It is a member of the City and Regional Magazine Association (CRMA).

Led by editor-in-chief Maer Roshan, the magazine has been the recipient of four National Magazine Awards.

History
Los Angeles was first published in 1961. It was purchased by CHC in 1973. ABC bought the magazine in 1977. ABC was eventually bought by The Walt Disney Company, which sold Los Angeles to Emmis in 2000. The magazine was purchased by Hour Media LLC on February 28, 2017.

Digital expansion and destination sites

LAMag.com 
Since, May 20th, 1996, Lamag.com has served as an up-to-the-minute daily resource for people who want to keep up with what matters in Los Angeles, directly from the team responsible for the periodical, Los Angeles Magazine. The site covers local politics and breaking news to commentary and coverage of the cultural and food scenes, the site aims to keep Angelenos informed and entertained.

Events 
In addition to Los Angeles’ annual epicurean fete, The Food Event, and the Breakfast Conversation discussion series with magazine editors and city leaders, the magazine’s event team draws a high-powered and well-heeled audience to more than 135 experiences each year. Los Angeles magazine events bring editorial content to life particularly in the areas of fashion, food, arts and culture, entertainment, and luxury lifestyle.

References

External links
 
 New York Review of Magazines: Los Angeles magazine

1961 establishments in California
Monthly magazines published in the United States
Local interest magazines published in the United States
Magazines established in 1961
Magazines published in Los Angeles